Matthew of Albano (Matthieu, O.S.B.) (died 1134) was a French Benedictine monk and Cardinal, and papal legate. He is a Catholic saint.

He was instrumental in the recognition of the Knights Templar, at the 1129 Council of Troyes.

He was a nephew of Hugh de Boves, abbot of Reading, bishop of Amiens and then archbishop of Rouen. They were both from a noble background, near Laon.

Notes

1134 deaths
French Benedictines
12th-century French cardinals
Cardinal-bishops of Albano
Year of birth unknown